The canton of Vendôme is an administrative division of the Loir-et-Cher department, central France. It was created at the French canton reorganisation which came into effect in March 2015. Its seat is in Vendôme.

It consists of the following communes:
 
Areines
Azé
Mazangé
Meslay
Sainte-Anne
Saint-Ouen
Vendôme
Villiers-sur-Loir

References

Cantons of Loir-et-Cher